"Gimme Love" is a Grammy-nominated song written and recorded by Matt B and Ugandan artist, Eddy Kenzo. The single was recorded by Matt B and Kenzo in October 2021 and was issued as a single on March 4, 2022, internationally. The song peaked at number 36 on the Billboard US Afrobeats Songs chart in November 2022. On the Viba Hot 100, Uganda's official singles chart, it peaked at number ten. "Gimme Love" was nominated for a Grammy Award for Best Global Music Performance in 2022.

Matt B and Kenzo performed "Gimme Love" at the Eddy Kenzo Festival at Kololo Airstrip in Uganda to an audience of over 20,000, including Uganda's Prime Minister Robinah Nabbanja.

Background
Matt B wanted to create an Afrobeats EP and reached out to various African artists to collaborate with. Eddy Kenzo was one of the first artists that he contacted.  They later met up in the recording studio and wrote and recorded, Gimme Love. The single was produced by Angela Benson, Greg Scelsa, and Steyn. It was recorded in English and Luganda and released on Vitae Records. A dance remix of "Gimme Love" was released in 2022.

Reception
"Gimme Love" received favorable reviews and was nominated for a Grammy Award for Best Global Music Performance in 2022. The nomination was the first for Matt B as well as Kenzo.

The single charted at number 36 on Billboard's Afrobeats chart and number 10 on Uganda's official singles chart. The single's music video won numerous awards at film festivals including Best Song at the New York International Film Festival and Best Music Video. Matt B's wife, producer, and manager, Angela Benson co-directed the video with videographer Steven 'PhillyFlyBoy' Phillip.

Charts

Awards

Personnel
 Matt B – lead vocals
 Eddy Kenzo – lead vocals
 Steyn – all instrumentation
 Angela Valarie Benson – producer
 Greg Scelsa – producer
 Steyn – producer
 Mack Woodward – mix/mastering engineer
 Charles 'Babi' Kouassi – recording engineer

References

2021 songs
2022 singles
World music songs